Fessenden may refer to:

People
 Fessenden (surname)
 Larry Fessenden (born March 23, 1963), an American actor, producer, writer, director, film editor, and cinematographer
 Fessenden Nott Otis (1825-c. 1900), American pioneer in the medical field of urology
 Reginald Fessenden (1866-1932) Canadian/American inventor
 Stirling Fessenden (1875-1944), lawyer and Chairman/Secretary General of the Shanghai Municipal Council
 Susan Fessenden (1840–1932), American activist, reformer 
 William P. Fessenden (1806-1869) Senator and Secretary of the Treasury under Lincoln

Places
 Fessenden, North Dakota, a city
 15939 Fessenden, an asteroid named after Reginald Fessenden
 Fessenden, a fictional princedom in Melanie Rawn's Dragon Prince fantasy novel series

Other uses  
 USS Fessenden (DE-142), a destroyer escort which served in World War II, named in honor of Reginald Fessenden
 Fessenden School, a private day and boarding school for boys in West Newton, Massachusetts
 Fessenden (guitars), a pedal steel guitar manufacturer
 Fessenden oscillator, an underwater sound projector